The basketball tournament at the 1951 Mediterranean Games was held in Alexandria, Egypt.

Participating teams
The following countries have participated for the final tournament:

Final tournament
All times local : CET (UTC+2)

Matches

Medalists

Final standings

References
1951 Competition Medalists

Basketball
Basketball at the Mediterranean Games
International basketball competitions hosted by Egypt
1951–52 in European basketball
1951 in Asian basketball
1951 in African basketball